The Roger Williams Handicap was an American Thoroughbred horse race run annually at Narragansett Park in Pawtucket, Rhode Island and named for the founder of the State of Rhode Island. The track sat on land just west of the Ten Mile River which Roger Williams traveled down after being banished from Massachusetts in 1636. The track management had purchased the land from the former What Cheer Airport in 1934. Curiously, “What cheer, Netop” were the words called out by the Narragansett Indians when Roger Williams first set foot in the place he was to call "Providence". Only the word Netop − meaning "friend" − is Indian and the phrase was meant as a greeting.

The first big Saturday stakes race run at Narragansett Park was the $7,500 added Roger Williams Handicap. On August 4, 1934, C.V. Whitney's Roustabout won by a head with jockey Al Robertson aboard. The first five editions were run at one mile.

The 1935 race saw Advising Anna set a track record of 1:37 that would never be broken.  As Narragansett was a one-mile track, this led to a short run to the first turn and the one mile distance was seldom used. Fair Knightess, who had gained notoriety for her Massachusetts Handicap battle with Seabiscuit, won the race in 1937 and was soon purchased by Charles S. Howard.

After a two-year hiatus the Roger Williams Handicap was reinstated at the distance of 1 1/16th mile. From 1941 to 1948 the added money event was held at this distance and drew top handicap horses, owners, trainers and jockeys to the track. In 1946 it was W. G. Loew's Helioptic winning the $13,275 event before a post-war crowd of more than 30,000 that bet 1.79 million dollars. Helioptic had been bred by the famous Coldstream Stud of Kentucky.

In 1949, the purse was up to $16,700 and the race was extended to 1 3/16 mile, the same distance as the prestigious Narragansett Special. Before a big weekend gathering it was Calumet Farm's Coaltown winning by 12 lengths in a performance that led trainer H.A. Jones to send Coaltown to Chicago. He proceeded to win four big races of the Midwest, set a new world record for the mile (1:34), and was named Handicap Horse of the Year. Those that saw him run would remember the experience for years. Coaltown would be inducted into the National Museum of Racing and Hall of Fame in 1983.

By its last four runnings, the Roger Williams Handicap served as a prep race for the much richer Narragansett Special as the Rhode Island Handicap was discontinued. On October 30, 1954 the Roger Williams Handicap was dusted off one last time and run at 1 1/16 miles. Red Head Stable's Blue Dare, with Paul Bohenko up, won the race by a length and a half in the mud at 8−1 on the tote board.

Winners

References

Horse races in the United States
Discontinued horse races
Sports in Rhode Island
Recurring sporting events established in 1934
Recurring sporting events disestablished in 1954
1934 establishments in Rhode Island
1954 disestablishments in Rhode Island